Cheryl Noble (born September 29, 1956) is a Canadian curler, world champion and Olympic medallist. She received a bronze medal at the 2002 Winter Olympics in Salt Lake City.

She is world champion from 2000, and a Canadian senior champion from 2008 and 2010 and a World senior champion from 2009.

References

External links
 

1956 births
Canadian women curlers
Curlers at the 2002 Winter Olympics
Curlers from Victoria, British Columbia
Living people
Medalists at the 2002 Winter Olympics
Olympic bronze medalists for Canada
Olympic curlers of Canada
Olympic medalists in curling
World curling champions